Mostar railway station (Bosnian: Željeznička stanica Mostar) is a railway station located in Mostar, Bosnia and Herzegovina, in the eastern part of the city, near the Carinský Bridge, on Maršala Tita Street. The terminal also includes a bus station.

History
The station opened on 14 June 1885, when the first section of the Southern Railway was completed with some rail traffic had already commenced on 26 January 1885. Built with authorization of the Austro-Hungarian Monarchy to better to establish communication from the interior to the sea, the line runs through the valley of the Neretva River. The line was built to Bosnian gauge of 760mm.

The opening of the station was a huge social event for the city, which was gradually modernizing after centuries of Turkish rule. The old railway station, built entirely in the spirit of Austro-Hungarian architecture, was known primarily for the fact that there was an entrance to the waiting room from the street side and then an entrance to the platform from the other side. In 1963 the line was realigned and rebuilt to Standard gauge; as a result, a number of stations along the line were upgraded, including Mostar. The new station was relocated from its original location, the original station was demolished, with a new street in the city built on the track alignment. The new modern, spacious terminal with two platforms was built in Brutalist style. The new line was officially opened on 26 and 27 November 1966. The line was electrified by 1969, becoming Yugoslavia's first AC-electrified rail line.

By early 1992, the Ploče-Sarajevo railway bosted APB, remote control of traction, and remote control of traffic to ensure a high level of safety in rail traffic and new rollingstock, making it one of most modern railways in Europe. However, in 1992, in connection with the war in Bosnia and Herzegovina, Railway facilities and infrastructure were damaged or destroyed, with the original railway archive located in the station area burned. The total damage is estimated at $1 billion US dollars. The line was closed from 2015 to 2017 for repairs and upgrades. Today the station still operations, but is slightly rundown and with only a few long-distance services.

In early February 2020, the station was hit by storm force winds that damage parts of the roof of the main building. In March, the still damaged building was flooded, with passengers forced to access the platforms through the adjacent building.

Services

Trains
Since 2010 passenger service uses Talgo trains. The Sarajevo–Ploče line was closed from 2015 to 2017 for repairs and upgrades. Passenger service did not extend into Croatia; the final distance from Čapljina at the border to Ploče, where a rail replacement bus service was in operation. Nonetheless, during the summer of 2022, the Talgo service from Sarajevo was extended to the Croatian coastal town of Ploče during the weekends. Starting from 1 July 2022. until 11 September 2022. the train runs three times a week, on Fridays, Saturdays and Sundays.

Čapljina – Mostar – Konjic – Sarajevo (two per day and direction)

The trains are operated by Railways of the Federation of Bosnia and Herzegovina (ŽFBH).

Buses
Mostar coach station is outside the railway station with coaches to many destinations in BiH and surrounding countries.

City buses also serve the station.

Station layout

Gallery

References

External links

railway station
Mostar